The Nitobe Memorial Garden is a -acre (one hectare) traditional Japanese garden located at the University of British Columbia, just outside the city limits of Vancouver, British Columbia, Canada. It is part of the UBC Botanical Garden.

Background 

The garden honours Japanese author, educator, diplomat, and politician Nitobe Inazō (1862–1933), who died in Victoria, British Columbia (now the sister city of Nitobe's home town Morioka), and whose goal was "to become a bridge across the Pacific".

The garden has been the subject of more than fifteen years' study by a UBC professor, who believes that its construction hides a number of impressive features, including references to Japanese philosophy and mythology, shadow bridges visible only at certain times of year, and positioning of a lantern that is filled with light at the exact date and time of Nitobe's death each year. The garden is behind the university's Asian Centre, which is built with steel girders from Japan's exhibit at Osaka Expo.

Features 
The Garden features a fully functional Japanese tea house called Ichibō-an, surrounded by an outer roji tea garden with a waiting bench and an inner garden.

The garden also features several lanterns of different varieties, including a snow viewing lantern, and the Nitobe Lantern, featuring carvings of a zodiac, chrysanthemums, a dog (Nitobe's birth sign), and the inscription "I.M., Inazo Nitobe, 1861–1933, Apostle of Goodwill Among Nations, Erected by his friends."

Another feature of the garden is its pond, which supports a small ecosystem of fish as well as some water skimming insects.

References

External links 

 Nitobe Memorial Garden Homepage

Gardens in Canada
Japanese-Canadian culture
Japanese gardens in Canada
Japanese tea gardens
University of British Columbia
Tourist attractions in Vancouver